Rubén "Rubo" Iranzo Lendínez (born 14 March 2003) is a Spanish professional footballer who plays as a central defender for Valencia CF Mestalla.

Club career
Iranzo was born in Picanya, Valencian Community, and joined Valencia CF's youth setup in 2011, from Javi Garrido de Torrent CF. On 8 June 2021, after finishing his formation, he signed his first professional contract until 2025, and was promoted to the reserves in Tercera División RFEF.

Iranzo made his senior debut on 18 September 2021, coming on as a late substitute in a 4–0 home routing of CD Olímpic de Xàtiva. On 20 December, he made his first team – and La Liga – debut, replacing Cristiano Piccini in a 4–3 away win over rivals Levante UD.

International career
Iranzo represented Spain at under-16, under-17, under-18 and under-19 levels.

References

External links
 
 
 

2003 births
Living people
People from Horta Oest
Sportspeople from the Province of Valencia
Spanish footballers
Footballers from the Valencian Community
Association football defenders
La Liga players
Tercera Federación players
Valencia CF Mestalla footballers
Valencia CF players
Spain youth international footballers